Jessica Baldassarre, known as Jessie Baylin, is a Nashville-based singer/songwriter.

Career

Her album Firesight was written by Baylin, Jesse Harris, Mike Daly, Mark Goldenberg, Greg Wells and Danny Wilde, and was produced and engineered by Roger Moutenot.

Personal life
Baylin is married to Nathan Followill, the drummer for  Kings of Leon. The two were married on November 14, 2009 in Brentwood, Tennessee at the Wolf Den Farm. She gave birth to their daughter, Violet Marlowe Followill, on December 26, 2012. Baylin moved to Nashville, Tennessee to live with her husband.

Discography
You (iTunes)
Firesight (2008, Verve Forecast label)
Little Spark (2012, Blonde Rat Records label)
Thorns (2012, Single)
Dark Place (2015, Blonde Rat Records label)
Strawberry Wind (2018, Blonde Rat Records label) (Amazon Exclusive Album)
Jersey Girl (2022, Blonde Rat Records label)

References

External links
Official website

1984 births
Living people
People from Long Hill Township, New Jersey
21st-century American women singers